Leucoptera  is a genus of moths in the family Lyonetiidae. Its members are leaf borers many of which can cause severe damage to plant crops, such as coffee or apples.

Selected species
Leucoptera aceris (Fuchs, 1903)
Leucoptera acromelas (Turner, 1923)
Leucoptera adenocarpella (Staudinger, 1871)
Leucoptera andalusica Mey, 1994
Leucoptera arethusa Meyrick, 1915
Leucoptera argodes Turner, 1923
Leucoptera argyroptera Turner, 1923
Leucoptera asbolopasta Turner, 1923
Leucoptera astragali Mey & Corley, 1999
Leucoptera auronivea (Walker, 1875)
Leucoptera autograpta Meyrick, 1918
Leucoptera caffeina Washburn, 1940
Leucoptera calycotomella Amsel, 1939
Leucoptera chalcopleura Turner, 1923
Leucoptera chalocycla (Meyrick, 1882)
Leucoptera clerodendrella Vári, 1955
Leucoptera coffeella (Guérin-Méneville, 1842)
Leucoptera coma Ghesquière, 1940
Leucoptera coronillae (M. Hering, 1933)
Leucoptera crobylistis Meyrick, 1926 (India)
Leucoptera cytisiphagella Klimesch, 1938
Leucoptera deltidias Meyrick, 1906
Leucoptera diasticha Turner, 1923
Leucoptera ermolaevi Seksjaeva, 1990
Leucoptera euryphaea Turner, 1926
Leucoptera erythrinella Busck, 1900
Leucoptera genistae (M. Hering, 1933)
Leucoptera guettardella Busck, 1900
Leucoptera hemizona Meyrick, 1906
Leucoptera heringiella Toll, 1938
Leucoptera hexatoma Meyrick, 1915 (India)
Leucoptera iolitha Turner, 1923
Leucoptera karsholti Mey, 1994
Leucoptera laburnella (Stainton, 1851) - laburnum leaf miner
Leucoptera lathyrifoliella (Stainton, 1866)
Leucoptera lotella (Stainton, 1859)
Leucoptera loxaula Meyrick, 1928
Leucoptera lustratella (Herrich-Schäffer, 1855)
Leucoptera malifoliella (Costa, 1836)
Leucoptera melanolitha Turner, 1923
Leucoptera meyricki Ghesquière, 1940
Leucoptera nieukerkeni Mey, 1994
Leucoptera obelacma Meyrick, 1918
Leucoptera onobrychidella Klimesch, 1937
Leucoptera orobi (Stainton, 1869)
Leucoptera pachystimella Busck, 1904
Leucoptera parinaricola Vári, 1955
Leucoptera periphracta Meyrick, 1915
Leucoptera phaeopasta (Turner, 1923)
Leucoptera plagiomitra Turner, 1923
Leucoptera psophocarpella Bradley & Carter, 1982
Leucoptera puerariella Kuroko, 1964
Leucoptera pulchricola Vári, 1955
Leucoptera robinella Braun, 1925
Leucoptera scammatias Meyrick, 1909
Leucoptera selenocycla Meyrick, 1930
Leucoptera sinuella (Reutti, 1853) (sometimes placed in Paraleucoptera)
Leucoptera sortita Meyrick, 1915
Leucoptera spartifoliella (Hübner, 1813)
Leucoptera sphenograpta Meyrick, 1911
Leucoptera strophidota Turner, 1923
Leucoptera thessalica Mey, 1994
Leucoptera toxeres Turner, 1923
Leucoptera zanclaeella (Zeller, 1848)

Species placed in Paraleucoptera by some authors 
Leucoptera albella (Chambers, 1871) - cottonwood leaf miner
Leucoptera heinrichi W. W. Jones, 1947

Species placed in Proleucoptera by some authors 
Leucoptera celastrella (Kuroko, 1964)
Leucoptera oxyphyllella (Kuroko, 1964)
Leucoptera smilactis (Kuroko, 1964)
Leucoptera smilaciella (Busck, 1900)

External links

 
Agricultural pest insects
Lyonetiidae
Moth genera